Bengt Sune Mangs (31 December 1932 – 11 February 1994) was a Swedish actor. He appeared in more than 35 films and television shows between 1953 and 1990. Born in Finland, Mangs' parents divorced in the midst of the Winter War, and eight-year-old Mangs moved to Stockholm with his mother and siblings.

Partial filmography

 Speed Fever (1953) - Pupil
 Blockerat spår (1955) - Heikki, Benkan's Friend
 Den tappre soldaten Jönsson (1956) - Soldier
 The Koster Waltz (1958) - Fotograf (uncredited)
 The Jazz Boy (1958) - Jerka, swingpjatt på Milles café
 Laila (1958) - Speaker at the reindeer race
 Fröken Chic (1959) - Distrainer (uncredited)
 Heaven and Pancake (1959) - Torbjörn Lindelöf (uncredited)
 Sängkammartjuven (1959) - Journalist (uncredited)
 Do You Believe in Angels? (1961) - Bojström, bank clerk (uncredited)
 Svenska Floyd (1961) - Sculptor
 Lovely Is the Summer Night (1961) - Jailer (uncredited)
 Lita på mej älskling (1961) - Photographer (uncredited)
 Prins hatt under jorden (1963) - Man at party
 Äktenskapsbrottaren (1964) - Herr Paavo
 Calle P. (1965) - Behrman
 30 pinnar muck (1966) - Junk Salesman
 Bamse (1968) - Drunk (uncredited)
 Hur Marie träffade Fredrik (1969) - Uncle Urban
 Åsa-Nisse i rekordform (1969) - Finnish man (uncredited)
  (1970) - Caretaker
 I död mans spår (1975) - Bartender
 The Adventures of Picasso (1978) - Churchill
 Barnförbjudet (1979) - The man with the sausages
 Sverige åt svenskarna (1980) - French minstrel
 Göta kanal eller Vem drog ur proppen? (1981) - Serviceman
 Fanny and Alexander (1982) - Mr. Salenius (Actor) - Teatern
 Spökligan (1987) - Olle
 In the Shadow of the Raven (1988) - Bishop

References

External links

1932 births
1994 deaths
20th-century Swedish male actors
Swedish male film actors
Swedish male television actors
People from Kaskinen
Finnish emigrants to Sweden
Swedish-speaking Finns